"Turn It Up" is the 2005 debut single of Chamillionaire, featuring Lil' Flip. It was produced by Scott Storch. "Turn It Up" was the first single from Chamillionaire's major label debut album, The Sound of Revenge. The music video is filmed in Houston, and features cameo appearances by Crooked I, Mannie Fresh and Chamillionaire's brother Rasaq. Lil' Flip is noticed wearing a "Free Cassidy" shirt in the video, showing his support for Cassidy while he was in jail for attempted murder. This hip hop song peaked at number 41 on the Billboard Hot 100.

Remixes and Samples
A remix of the song which features Lil' O, HAWK and E.S.G. is featured on It's Going Down 3, a mixtape hosted by Chamillionaire with production by CHOPS and on The Sound of Revenge bonus disc.

The lyric from the song; "Check out my track record, they say Imma track Wrecka" has been sampled by British rapper Sir-B (Imperial Squad) for the grime song "Track Wrecka" released in 2007 via Channel U.

Charts

References

2005 debut singles
Chamillionaire songs
Lil' Flip songs
Song recordings produced by Scott Storch
Songs written by Chamillionaire
Songs written by Scott Storch
2005 songs
Crunk songs
Songs written by Lil' Flip